The Confraternity Carnival, commonly referred to as Confro, is the premier rugby league competition for Catholic and independent secondary schools in Queensland, Australia, held annually since 1980. Administered by the Queensland Rugby League and run by the Queensland Independent Secondary Schools Rugby League, the competition is a week-long carnival that features over 1,000 students from up to 48 schools in July each year.

In 2020 a Girls competition was introduced for the first time. However, this was cancelled in 2020 and cut short in 2021 due to COVID-19. The historic inaugural Girls winners were Marymount College in 2022.

The carnival has featured a number of current and former Australian and Queensland representatives, including Johnathan Thurston, Matthew Scott, Matthew Bowen, Bob Lindner, Xavier Coates, Wendell Sailor, Daly Cherry-Evans, Michael Morgan and Cameron Munster. 

The most successful school is St Brendan's College, Yeppoon, while the current holders of the Confraternity Shield are Ignatius Park College, who won the competition in 2019 and 2022.

History
In 1980, the first Confraternity Carnival was held in Bundaberg and featured just six teams. Prior to this, Christian Brothers schools from Bundaberg and Ipswich competed against each other for the Bunswich Shield. The first winners of the Confraternity Shield were Aquinas College, Ashmore, who also won the second carnival in 1981, becoming the first side to win back-to-back shields. 

By 1990, the Carnival had grown to 21 teams. From 1988 to 1992, St Patrick's College, Mackay won the shield five times in a row, a record as of 2020. In 2006, 40 schools took part for the first time, growing to 48 in 2015. In 2013, Ignatius Park College became just the second school to win three straight shields. 

In 2018, St Mary's Catholic College, Casino became the first New South Wales-based school to compete at the carnival. They were coached by former North Sydney Bears halfback Paul McCaffery.

On 3 April 2020, the Carnival was cancelled for the first time in its history due to COVID-19. The competition was set to take place at Brisbane's Iona College.

Format
As of 2019, the format of the carnival sees the 48 schools divided into pools of four, with four pools making up the three divisions (either 1, 2 or 3). The schools play the other teams in their pool once before the finals begin. Which division a school is in determines which prize they compete for. Teams in Division 1 compete for the Confraternity Shield, the biggest prize of the carnival, and the Confraternity Trophy. Teams in Division 2 compete for the Confraternity Plate and the Confraternity Bowl, while teams in Division 3 compete for the Confraternity Cup and Challenge Trophy.

The first two days of the carnival are for the pool games and the quarter-finals. A rest day is then held before the semi-finals take place on day four. The final day then features the six Grand Finals, with the Shield game played last. Also on the final day, the team who didn't make the Grand Finals compete in consolation playoff finals.

Until 1988, the schools competed solely for the Shield. As more schools joined, more trophies were added. The first was the Confraternity Trophy, which is known as the Bob Lindner Trophy. Lindner was the first Carnival participant to represent Australia.

Results

Player of the Carnival
The Player of the Carnival is awarded to the most outstanding player in the competition. First awarded in 1982, past winners included future Australian and Queensland representatives Julian O'Neill, Wendell Sailor, Matthew Bowen and David Taylor.

See also
NRL Schoolboy Cup
Australian Schoolboys rugby league team

References

External links
 QISSRL Confraternity Carnival website

Rugby league competitions in Australia
Rugby league competitions in Queensland
1980 in rugby league
Junior rugby league
Recurring sporting events established in 1980
1980 establishments in Australia
High school sports in Australia